Edward Raymond Hanford (1845–1890) was a private in the 2nd U.S. Cavalry, Company H, during the American Civil War. Born in Allegany County, New York, in 1845, Hanford captured the battle flag of the 32nd Battalion Virginia Cavalry of the Confederate States of America at the Battle of Tom's Brook, Woodstock, Virginia, on 9 October 1864. The Union charge, led by generals Wesley Merritt and George Armstrong Custer, successfully forced the Confederates to retreat  southward of Woodstock. Hanford received the Medal of Honor on 14 October 1864 for capturing the Confederate battle flag during the charge and for demonstrating "extraordinary heroism". Hanford died in California in 1890 and was buried in the Mokelumne Hill Protestant Cemetery of Mokelumne Hill, Calaveras County.

See also
List of American Civil War Medal of Honor recipients
Battle of Tom's Brook

Notes

References

External links
Find a Grave Edward R Hanford

1845 births
1890 deaths
United States Army Medal of Honor recipients
People from Allegany County, New York
Union Army soldiers
Death in California
Burials in California
American Civil War recipients of the Medal of Honor